Mang Kung Uk is a village in Sai Kung District, New Territories, Hong Kong.

Administration
Mang Kung Uk is a recognized village under the New Territories Small House Policy.

See also
 Hang Hau

References

External links
 Delineation of area of existing village Mang Kung Uk (Hang Hau) for election of resident representative (2019 to 2022)

 

Villages in Sai Kung District, Hong Kong